The Royal Conservatory of Brussels is a historic conservatory in Brussels, Belgium. Starting its activities in 1813, it received its official name in 1832. Providing performing music and drama courses, the institution became renowned partly because of the international reputation of its successive directors such as François-Joseph Fétis, François-Auguste Gevaert, Edgar Tinel, Joseph Jongen or Marcel Poot, but more because it has been attended by many of the top musicians, actors and artists in Belgium such as Arthur Grumiaux, José Van Dam, Sigiswald Kuijken, Josse De Pauw, Luk van Mello and Luk De Konink. Adolphe Sax, inventor of the saxophone, also studied at the Brussels Conservatory.

While the French-speaking entity remained an independent public institution of higher education (École supérieure des arts), the Flemish entity integrated the Erasmus University College as one of its Schools of Arts.

Building 
The current Royal Conservatory building consists of three wings arranged around a courtyard and is the work of architect Jean-Pierre Cluysenaer, built to his designs between 1872 and 1876.

The style is neo-Renaissance, influenced by the Lescot Wing of the Louvre. The decorative program of the facade is very elaborate, with five separate pediment sculptures (Instrumental Music by Liège sculptor Adolphe Fassin, Orchestration by Charles van der Stappen, Composition by Antwerp sculptor Frans Deckers, Performing Arts by Antoine-Félix Bouré, and Poetry by Tournai sculptor Barthélemy Frison) and other incidental work including garlands, caryatids, palm trees and musical instruments by sculptors Georges Houtstont, Paul de Vigne, Antoine-Joseph Van Rasbourgh, Auguste Braekevelt, and Égide Mélot.

Auxiliary activities

Concerts 
Each year a variety of regular student concerts and performances is organised by the Conservatory, boasting over hundred events and enhanced by two festivals.

The right wing of the Conservatory contains a 600 seats ornate concert hall in Napoleon-III style with exceptional acoustic qualities, equipped with a Cavaillé-Coll organ.

Musical Instrument Museum (MIM) 
Founded in 1877 to provide students with a practical education about ancien instruments, the Conservatory museum, currently referred to as the Musical Instrument Museum (MIM) of Brussels displays over 8,000 ancient instruments acquired by the celebrated musicologist François-Joseph Fétis, rare pieces from the initial collection, from the various funds or from new acquisitions. Since 2000, the museum, one of the most important ones of its kind, is located in the prestigious Art Nouveau building conceived in 1899 by the architect Paul Saintenoy for the former Old England department store.

Library 
Initially created with a pedagogic aim, the Conservatory library hosts about 250,000  references, representing a scientific instrument of international resonance.

It primarily consists of works about music (including more than 1200 musical or musicological periodicals), as well as of autograph, printed or digitized (scanned) scores. There is also an important collection of more than 8.000 libretti of Italian, French or German operas from the XVIIe and XVIIIe s., lute and guitar tablatures, several thousands of handwritten letters of musicians, iconographic documents (over 9.000 pieces), concert programmes and various types of recordings (magnetic tapes, video, 78 and 33 rpm vinyl, CD, etc.).

Next to the core collections, the library possesses several subcollections of historical importance, together forming an extensive patrimony:
 the Johann J.H. Westphal collection bought by Fétis (manuscripts of C.P.E. Bach and G.P. Telemann), 
 the Richard Wagener collection acquired by the librarian Alfred Wotquenne (German music from the XVIIe, XVIIIe and XIXe s. including 40 autograph manuscripts from three sons of J.-S. Bach), 
 the Jean-Lucien Hollenfeltz collection (documents of Constance Mozart and her youngest son Franz Xaver Amadeus Mozart), 
 the Maria Malibran collection (documents and objects from the cantatrice and her close family), 
 the Edmond Michotte collection (pieces from Rossini's private library), 
 the Józef Wieniawski collection (autograph scores from the pianist), 
 the Laurent Halleux collection, 
 the Joseph Jongen collection.

The library is open to the general public. In 2015, the library acquired the score collection of CeBeDeM (Belgian Centre for Music Documentation). In doing so it also took over the latter's objectives in promoting Belgian contemporary music worldwide.

Personalities linked to the Royal Conservatory of Brussels

Directors 
 1833–1871: François-Joseph Fétis
 1871–1908: François-Auguste Gevaert
 1908–1912: Edgar Tinel
 1912–1925: Léon Du Bois
 1925–1939: Joseph Jongen
 1939–1949: Léon Jongen
 1949–1966: Marcel Poot

Directors of the Conservatoire Royal de Bruxelles 
 1966–1973: Camille Schmit (in French)
 1974–1987: Éric Feldbusch (in French)
 1987–2002: Jean Baily (in French)
 2003–present: Frédéric de Roos

Directors of the Koninklijk Conservatorium Brussel 
 1966–1994: Kamiel D'Hooghe (in Dutch)
 1994–2004: Arie Van Lysebeth (in Dutch)
 2004–2008: Rafael D'haene
 2008–2017: Peter Swinnen
 2017–2021: Kathleen Coessens
2021–present: Jan D'haene

Notable faculty 

 Charles-Auguste de Bériot, violin
 Daniel Blumenthal (piano) 
 Lola Bobesco (violin)
 François Daneels, saxophone
 Luc Devos (piano)
 Paul Dombrecht (oboe)
 François Fernandez (baroque)
 Bernard Foccroule, organ
 Julien Ghyoros, direction
 Katarina Glowicka, computer music
 Philippe Graffin, violin
 Yossif Ivanov (violin)
 Barthold Kuijken (baroque)
 Jacques Leduc (direction, composition)
 Jacques-Nicolas Lemmens, organ
 Jean Louël, piano
 Jan Michiels (piano)
 Norbert Nozy (brass band)
 Igor Oistrach (violin)
 Philippe Pierlot (baroque)
 Marie Pleyel, piano
 Eliane Reyes, piano
 Adolphe Samuel, composition
 Adrien François Servais (cello)
 André Souris (direction, composition)
 Annelies Van Parys, form analysis
 Henri Vieuxtemps, violin
 Boyan Vodenitcharov (piano)
 Henryk Wieniawski, violin
 Eugène Ysaÿe, violin
 Juliusz Zarębski, piano

Notable alumni

 Isaac Albéniz
 Elie Apper
 Atar Arad
 Oskar Back
 Peter Benoit
 Fabrizio Cassol
 Claire Chevallier
 Alain Crépin
 François Daneels
 Lara Fabian
 Gianfranco Pappalardo Fiumara
 John Giordano
 Edwin Grasse
 Mansoor Hosseini
 Albert Huybrechts
Anthony Jennings
 Désiré Magnus
 Alma Moodie
 Norbert H. J. Nozy
 André Rieu
 Elsa Ruegger
 Noël Samyn (fr)
 Adolphe Sax
Celia Torra
 José van Dam
 Carl Verbraeken
 Aimee Wiele
 Alfred Wotquenne
 Eugène Ysaÿe

References

External links

 Koninklijk Conservatorium Brussel
 Conservatoire Royal de Bruxelles
 Erasmus University College
 Arts Platform Brussels
 http://www.lacambre.be
 http://www.insas.be
 Royal Conservatory of Brussels library catalog
 CeBeDeM
 Virtual exhibition : La collection de manuscrits de Georg Philipp Telemann (1681-1767) à la Bibliothèque des Conservatoires royaux de Bruxelles (French only)

 
Educational institutions established in 1813
1813 establishments in the Southern Netherlands
Arts organizations established in the 1810s
Drama schools in Belgium
Music schools in Belgium
Film schools in Belgium
Music in Brussels